Livezile is a commune located in Mehedinți County, Oltenia, Romania. It has 1,951 inhabitants. It is composed of five villages: Izvorălu de Jos, Izvoru Aneștilor, Livezile, Petriș and Ștefan Odobleja (Valea Izvorului until 2005).

Natives
Ștefan Odobleja (1902–1978)

References

Communes in Mehedinți County
Localities in Oltenia